The 1981–82 Southern Football League season was the 79th in the history of the league, an English football competition.

The league was split into Midland and Southern Divisions for a third and final season, at the end of it league restructuring for the forthcoming season meant that the top ten in each division (minus promoted clubs) would remain at the sixth level in a new Premier Division, whilst clubs finishing lower would be relegated to the seventh level.

Nuneaton Borough won the Midland Division, whilst Wealdstone won the Southern Division, both earning promotion to the Alliance Premier League, having both also been relegated from the APL the previous season. Wealdstone were declared Southern League champions after defeating Nuneaton on penalties, after the two championship play-offs had finished 2–2 on aggregate (Wealdstone won 2–1 at home and Nuneaton won 1–0). They completed the double by also winning the Southern League Cup.

At the end of the season Bedford Town folded, whilst Barry Town left to join the Welsh Football League.

Midland Division
The Midland Division consisted of 22 clubs, including 21 clubs from the previous season and one new club:
Nuneaton Borough, relegated from the Alliance Premier League

League table

Southern Division
The Southern Division consisted of 24 clubs, including 22 clubs from the previous season and two new clubs:
Wealdstone, relegated from the Alliance Premier League
Welling United, joined from the Athenian League

At the end of the previous season, Margate had been renamed Thanet United.

League table

See also
 Southern Football League
 1981–82 Isthmian League
 1981–82 Northern Premier League

References

Southern Football League seasons
6